Andy, also spelled Andi, Andie or Andee, is predominantly a diminutive version of the male given name Andrew, and variants of it such as Andreas and Andrei. The form of the variation is based on the Scottish "-ie" diminutive ending. Andrew is derived from the Greek name Andreas, meaning "manlike" or "brave". Andy is also occasionally used as a diminutive for the female given name Andrea in the English, German, Scandinavian and Spanish feminine version of the name Andrew (although Andrea is a masculine name in Italian). Although it is uncommon, some people named Alexander go by Andy. It is also occasionally spelled "Andie", "Andi", or "Andee" (these more often as a feminine name, but not exclusively). 

As a masculine name, it can also be a variant of Anthony (especially Andon, Andoni, Andonis, Andonios, Andoniaina & Andony). Andy can also be a feminine given name as an alternate form of Andrea. The Indian names Anand and Anindya are also sometimes shortened to Andy.

People

In arts and entertainment
 Andy Adler, American sportscaster and journalist
 Andy Allo (born 1989), American singer-songwriter
 Adda Husted Andersen (1898–1990) Danish American metalsmith and enameler nicknamed "Andy"
 Andy Bell (musician) (born 1970), formerly of Ride, Hurricane #1 and Oasis
 Andy Bell (singer) (born 1964), English singer with Erasure
 Andy Biersack (born 1990), lead vocalist of American rock band Black Veil Brides (also known as Andy Black and Andy Sixx)
 Andy Borg (born 1960), Austrian singer and television presenter 
 Andy Borodow (born 1969), Canadian wrestler
 Andy Buckley (born 1965), American actor
 Andy Cohen (TV personality) (born 1968), American TV producer, author and TV and radio host
 Andi Deris (born 1964), German singer and songwriter, lead sing of the power metal band Helloween
 Andy Detwiler (1969–2022), American farmer and internet personality
 Andy Devine (1905–1977), American actor
 Andy Dick (born 1965), American actor and comedian
 Andi Dorfman, former Bachelorette
 Andi Eigenmann (born 1990), Filipina actress and model
 Andy Erikson (born 1987), American standup comedian
 Andy Fraser (1952–2015), English bassist and songwriter, member of the rock band Free
 Andy García (born 1956), Cuban-American actor
 Andy Gibb (1958–1988), English singer and songwriter
 Andy Gill (1956–2020), English musician, member of the rock band Gang of Four
 Andy Griffith (1926–2012), American actor
 Andy Hurley, drummer of American band Fall Out Boy
 Andy Kaufman (1949–1984), American comedian
 Andy Lassner (born 1966), Colombian-American television producer
 Andy Lau, Hong Kong singer and actor
 Andy Lee (comedian), Australian comedian and radio presenter
 Andy Lee (German musician), German rock 'n' roll pianist
 Andy Lee (Korean singer), South Korean singer and actor, member of Shinhwa
 Andy Lewis (performer), American slackliner 
 Andie MacDowell (born 1958), American actress
 Andy McCoy, Finnish musician
 Andy Mckee, fingerstyle acoustic guitar player
 Andy McNab (born 1959), British soldier-turned-novelist
 Andy Milonakis, American comedian
 Andy On (born 1977), American actor and martial artist
 Andi Osho (born 1973), British actress and television presenter
 Andi Peters (born 1970), British television presenter
 Andy Prieboy (born 1955), American musician
 Andy Richter, American comic
 Andy Rooney, American television personality
 Andy Samberg (born 1978), American comedian and actor
 Andy Serkis, English actor
 Andy Summers, English musician with the Police
 Andy Taylor (guitarist), English musician with Duran Duran
 Andy Warhol (1928–1987), American artist
 Andy Whitfield (1974–2011), Welsh-Australian actor
 Andy Williams (1927–2012), American singer

In sports
 Andy Bathgate (born 1932), Canadian ice hockey player
 Andy Bell (boxer) (born 1985), British boxer
 Andy Bell (footballer, born 1956), English footballer
 Andy Bell (footballer, born 1984), English footballer
 Andy Bell (freestyle motocross rider) (born 1975), former freestyle motocross rider
 Andy Bell (Scottish footballer)
 Andy Bloom (athlete) (born 1973), American Olympic shot putter
 Andy Bowen (1867–1894), American boxer known for fighting the longest boxing match in history
 Andy Caddick, English cricketer
 Andy Cohen (baseball) (1904–1988), Major League Baseball second baseman and coach
 Andy Cole, English footballer 
 Andy Gruenebaum (born 1982), American soccer player
 Andy Heck, American football player and coach
 Andi Herzog (born 1968), Austrian football manager
 Andy Hill (basketball) (born c. 1950), American basketball player, TV executive, author, and speaker
 Andy Hug (1964–2000), Swiss karateka and kickboxer
 Andy Isabella (born 1997), American football player
 Andy Johnson (English footballer), English footballer
 Andy Johnson (Welsh footballer), Welsh footballer
 Andy Lee (American football) (born 1982), American football punter
 Andy Lee (boxer) (born 1984), Irish boxer
 Andy Lee (footballer, born 1982), English footballer for Bradford City
 Andy Lee (footballer, born 1962), English footballer for Tranmere Rovers
 Andy Lee (snooker player) (born 1980), Hong Kong snooker player
 Andy Leung (born 1990), Hong Kong windsurfer
 Andy Macdonald, American professional skateboarder
 Andy McDonald, Canadian ice hockey player
 Andy Mangan (born 1986), English footballer
 Andy Messersmith, baseball player
 Andi Murez (born 1992), Israeli-American Olympic swimmer for Israel
 Andrew Murray (tennis player) (born 1987), Scottish tennis player
 Andy Najar, Honduran footballer
 Andy Nicholls, English football hooligan and author
 Andy Pettitte, American baseball player
 Andy Phillip, American basketball player
 Andy Phillips, American baseball player
 Andy Priaulx, British racing driver
 Andy Ram (born 1980), Israeli tennis player
 Andy Reid, Super Bowl-winning NFL coach
 Andy Ristie (born 1982), Surinamese kickboxer
 Andy Robustelli, American football player
 Andy Roddick (born 1982), American professional tennis player
 Andy Sabados (1916–2004), American football player
 Andy Schleck (born 1985), Luxembourgish cyclist
 Andy Schliebener (born 1962), Canadian ice hockey player
 Andy Selva (born 1976), Sammarinese footballer
 Andy Sheets, American baseball player
 Andy Sonnanstine, American baseball player
 Andy Soucek (born 1985), Spanish auto racing driver
Andy Van Vliet (born 1995), Belgian basketball player for Bnei Herzliya Basket in the Israeli Basketball Premier League
 Andy Whing (born 1984), English footballer

Other
 Andy Bell (entrepreneur), AJ Bell Chief Executive
 Andy Bell (journalist) (born 1963), British journalist
 Andy Liu (born 1946 or 1947), Canadian mathematician
 Andi Meister (born 1938), Estonian engineer and politician

Fictional characters
 Andy, the son in Stepfather 3, a film
 Andy, a character played by American professional wrestler Silo Sam (1952–2005) in the 1985 film Pee-wee's Big Adventure
 Andie Anderson, in the romantic comedy How to Lose a Guy in 10 Days
 Andy Baker, in the Netflix series 13 Reasons Why
 Andy Barclay, from the Childs Play horro movie series
 Andy Beckett, from the 1993 film Philadelphia
 Andy Bernard, from the American television show The Office
 Andy Bogard, from the Fatal Fury video games series
 Andy Botwin, from  the Showtime series Weeds
 The title character of Andy Capp, an English comic strip
 Andrea "Andy" Carmichael, in the 1985 film The Goonies
 Andrea "Andi" Cruz, a character from the Nickelodeon series Every Witch Way, and protagonist of WITS Academy.
 Andy Davidson (Torchwood), from the British television series Torchwood
 Andy Davis (Toy Story), from the Toy Story animated film series
 Andy Dufresne, from the 1994 drama film The Shawshank Redemption
 Andy Dwyer, from the American television series Parks and Recreation
 Andy Fox (FoxTrot), from the comic strip FoxTrot
 Andy Hardy, protagonist of 16 films from 1937 to 1946, played by Mickey Rooney
 Andy Hargrove, from the television series One Tree Hill
 Andy Harris, from the American sitcom television series Roseanne
 Andy Johnson (Squirrel Boy), from the animated television series Squirrel Boy
 Andy Kewzer, from the movie The Final Destination
 Andy Larkin (What's with Andy), from the Canadian animated television series What's with Andy?
 Andy Lippincott, the first gay character in comics
 Andi Mack, the titular character of Disney Channel series Andi Mack
 Andy McNally (Rookie Blue), from the television series Rookie Blue
 Andy Millman, the lead character in the television series Extras
 Andy Moffett, in the American television series The Facts of Life
 Andy Panda in classic cartoons
 Andy Pandy, from children's television
 Andy Pipkin, from the British comedy series Little Britain
 Andi Prendergast, from the television series Reaper
 Andy Renko, from the television series Hill Street Blues
 Andy Sipowicz, from the television series NYPD Blue
 Andy Stitzer, the main character from the 2005 American romantic comedy movie The 40-Year-Old Virgin
 Andy Trudeau, from the television series Charmed
 Andy Taylor, from the American television show The Andy Griffith Show
 Andie Walsh, the main character of the film Pretty in Pink
 Andy West, title character of Jacqueline Wilson novel The Suitcase Kid
 One of the title characters in Amos 'n' Andy (1920s-1950s), a radio-serial situation comedy popular in the United States
 Andy, commanding officer in the video game Advance Wars
 Andy, main character from the game Heart of Darkness
 Andy, from Date Movie
 Andy (Peanuts), one of Snoopy's siblings from the comic strip Peanuts
 Andie, the red squirrel who has a crush on Surly in The Nut Job and The Nut Job 2: Nutty by Nature
 Officer Andy, a police man in 1992 horror movie Sleepwalkers

See also
Andi (disambiguation)

References

English masculine given names
English feminine given names
English unisex given names
Hypocorisms